The 2011 MercedesCup was a men's tennis tournament played on outdoor clay courts. It was the 34th edition of the Stuttgart Open, and was part of the ATP World Tour 250 series of the 2011 ATP World Tour. It was held at the Tennis Club Weissenhof in Stuttgart, Germany, from July 11 through July 18, 2011. Unseeded Juan Carlos Ferrero won the singles title.

ATP entrants

Seeds

Seedings are based on the rankings of July 4, 2011.

Other entrants
The following players received wildcards into the singles main draw:
  Robin Kern
  Łukasz Kubot
  Cedrik-Marcel Stebe

The following players received entry from the qualifying draw:

  Pavol Červenák
  Victor Crivoi
  Federico del Bonis
  Evgeny Donskoy

The following players received entry to the main draw as lucky loser:
  Bastian Knittel

Finals

Singles

 Juan Carlos Ferrero defeated  Pablo Andújar, 6–4, 6–0.
It was Ferrero's only title of the year and 16th and final title of his career.

Doubles

 Jürgen Melzer /  Philipp Petzschner defeated  Marcel Granollers /  Marc López, 6–3, 6–4.

References

External links
 Official website 
 ATP tournament profile

Stuttgart Open
Stuttgart Open
Stutt